The following list includes notable people who were born or have lived in Winter Park, Florida. For a similar list organized alphabetically by last name, see the category page People from Winter Park, Florida.

Arts and culture 

 Tony Curry, Visual Artist/Painter/Sculptor
 Michael Barimo, singer
 Amanda Bearse, actress
 James Bonamy, country musician
 JC Crissey, film producer
 Sasha De Sola, ballet dancer
 Gina Hecht, actress
 Laeta Kalogridis, screenwriter and producer
 Arielle Kebbel, actress
 Spencer Locke, actress
 Patty Maloney, actress
 Michael James Nelson, writer/actor
 Jo Ann Pflug, actress, graduated from a local high school
 Summer Phoenix, actress
 Albin Polasek, sculptor/educator
 Gamble Rogers, folk musician
 Annie Russell, theatrical actress
 Carrot Top, comedian
 George Weigel, artist
 Stephen Stills, musician

Business 

 Meg Crofton, business executive

Military 

 Delbert Black, first Master Chief Petty Officer of the Navy
 George Brett, general
 Onslow S. Rolfe, U.S. Army brigadier general

Politics and law 

 Kevin Beary, sheriff
 Louis Frey, Jr., congressman
 Paula Hawkins, politician
 Allen Trovillion, politician
 Daniel Webster, politician

Sports

Baseball 

 Orel Hershiser, professional baseball player
 Davey Johnson, professional baseball player

Basketball 

 Rashard Lewis, professional basketball player (Miami Heat)
 Doc Rivers, basketball coach ( Los Angeles Clippers)
 Austin Rivers, professional basketball player (Houston Rockets)
 Darius Washington, Jr., professional basketball player

Football 

 Tony Dollinger, NFL player
 Al Latimer, NFL player
 Willie Snead IV, NFL player

Golfing 

 Nick Faldo, golfer and broadcaster
 Matt Kuchar, golfer
 Lauren Thompson, broadcaster

Soccer 

 Dax McCarty, professional soccer player for the New York Red Bulls

Swimming 

 Fred Tyler, swimmer/coach

Wrestling 

 Fergal Devitt, professional wrestler WWE

References

Winter Park
Winter Park